"Everybody (Backstreet's Back)" is a song by American boy band Backstreet Boys, written and produced by Denniz Pop and Max Martin. It was released as the first single from the band's second international studio album Backstreet's Back in June 1997, and the third single from their self-titled debut US studio album in March 1998. The accompanying music video was directed by American director Joseph Kahn.

Background and release
Zomba chairman Clive Calder suggested that "Everybody (Backstreet's Back)" should be released as a single, which was met with resistance from Jive Records president Barry Weiss, as he believed that it would be weird to have a song called "Backstreet's Back" on the Backstreet Boys' first US album. The band suggested it could just mean that they were back home. After Canadian markets began playing the song, US markets near the border began picking the song up. They met with Weiss and asked that the song be added to the US album after the first million units had already been produced.

There are two versions of the song. The international album features the album or 7" version, which is the standard recording. The US album features the extended version of the song which includes an extended breakdown section, but cuts the bridge. The music video for the song was cut to both versions of the song, with the extended video released to the US market, and the standard video released everywhere else.

Critical reception
Larry Flick from Billboard stated that "Everybody (Backstreet's Back)" contained a "contagious dance/pop beat and catchy hook that perfectly showcases this talented group's voices". British magazine Music Week rated the song four out of five, adding that "the boys turn up the power on a strutting, soulful anthem, which will be one of the summer's bigger successes." Editor Alan Jones noted that Backstreet Boys "state the obvious" in the song, "but they do it with a certain amount of style. The mid-tempo piece is instantly assimilated and well-sung, primarily as a group effort. Another major hit is guaranteed."

Commercial performance
Written and produced by Max Martin and Denniz Pop, "Everybody (Backstreet's Back)" is one of the Backstreet Boys' most successful singles to date, reaching number four in the US Billboard Hot 100, running 22 weeks, and number three in the UK Singles Chart. It is certified platinum in the United States. This became the band's second top ten single in the US following Quit Playing Games (With My Heart).

Music video

Background
The accompanying music video for "Everybody" was directed by Joseph Kahn, and filmed in Los Angeles, California from June 16–18, 1997. Kahn was contacted by Jive to direct a project with a "white Jodeci". Initially unaware who the Backstreet Boys were, he was shocked by the group's European sales figures after being given a cassette tape and publicity release about them. Initially a grunge and hip-hop director, he wanted to explore the pop genre, since he grew up listening to music from the 1980s.

The haunted house aesthetic was based on a treatment Kahn envisioned for rapper Ice Cube a few months prior, and was inspired by the music video for Michael Jackson's "Thriller". Kahn and the group wanted Antonio Fargas to portray the bus driver, as they were fans of Starsky & Hutch. The video shoot lasted for 36 hours, with Nick Carter's mummy shot being filmed last. Jive did not get behind the concept of the band in costumes or the $1 million requirements, and did not believe MTV would respect the video. The band ultimately had to put up their own money to shoot the video and had to fight with the label to get reimbursed once it was successful. The video premiered outside the United States in July 1997, although viewers with MuchMusic USA were able to see it as at the time it was still mostly a simulcast of the Canadian channel. In a 2017 interview with Billboard, Kahn stated that the video's impact broadened his view of pop culture, while creating a new scene in the US.

Synopsis

The video is bookended by scenes framing the context. When the Backstreet Boys' bus breaks down, their bus driver (Antonio Fargas) insists that they spend a night at a nearby haunted mansion while he gets help. It then shows Brian Littrell preparing to sleep in one of the bedrooms. While he is in bed, he pulls out a scary animal from under his covers, making him scream in horror. The musical portion of the video then starts, playing as a dream sequence in which each band member appears as a different movie monster: Littrell as a werewolf; Howie Dorough as Dracula; Nick Carter as a mummy; AJ McLean as Erik, the Phantom of the Opera; and Kevin Richardson as both Dr. Jekyll and Mr. Hyde in a half-transformed Two-Face-like state. Throughout the beginning and middle of the song, the band, as monsters, mainly appear in their own individual vignettes related to their character; during the final chorus, they collectively appear in the foyer of the mansion, performing a dance routine with a group of additional dancers. Supermodel Josie Maran appears as Dorough's companion in his vignette, presumably portraying Mina Harker. At the end of the video, Littrell wakes up realizing that all was a nightmare. He talks with the members about his dream, all of them stating they had similar dreams, while trying to leave the house. However, the driver shows up, now a Frankenstein-esque monster, making the boys scream in horror.

There are two cuts of the video; one for the US market, and one for the international market, each of which features the edit of the song released on the album for that market. The international video cuts from the opening bookend to the first verse. The bridge of the song is intact and the first half of the dance routine, a ballroom dance portion, is intercut with the vignettes under it. This leads into the second half of the dance portion during the final choruses of the song which are not intercut with the vignettes. In the US cut, the ballroom half of the dance routine and the beginning of the second half are used at the start of the song during the first rhythm-only breakdown, and is not intercut with the vignettes. The second breakdown, which replaces the bridge, is accompanied only by shots from the vignettes, along with some shots of Littrell tumbling in the foyer and in the various vignettes. When the final chorus begins, the second half of the dance routine is shown again from the start, but is intercut with vignette scenes. Most of the remainder of the video is cut identically, other than several minor instances of alternate scenes or takes being used. The dance floor in the video was painted.

Awards and nominations

MTV Video Music Awards

|-
|rowspan="2"|1998
|rowspan="2"|"Everybody (Backstreet's Back)"
|Best Group Video
|
|-
|Best Dance Video
|

Nickelodeon Kids Choice Awards

|-
|rowspan="2"|1999
|rowspan="2"|Everybody (Backstreet's Back)
|Favorite Song
|

Grammy Awards

|-
||1999
||Everybody (Backstreet's Back)
|Best New Artist
|

MuchMusic Video Awards

|-
||1998
||Everybody (Backstreet's Back)
|Peoples Choice Favorite International Group
|

MTV Movie Awards

|-
||2014
|This Is the End (Performance)
|Best Musical Moment
|

Track listing

 US enhanced CD single
 "Everybody (Backstreet's Back)" (radio edit) – 3:45
 "Everybody (Backstreet's Back)" (Matty's Radio Mix) – 3:55
 "Everybody (Backstreet's Back)" (remix video)

 US enhanced maxi-single
 "Everybody (Backstreet's Back)" (Matty's Radio Mix) – 3:55
 "Everybody (Backstreet's Back)" (Multiman Remix) – 4:08
 "Everybody (Backstreet's Back)" (Sharp London Vocal Mix) – 7:58
 "Everybody (Backstreet's Back)" (radio edit) – 3:45
 "Everybody (Backstreet's Back)" (extended version) – 4:45
 "Everybody (Backstreet's Back)" (remix video)

 US 12-inch single
A1. "Everybody (Backstreet's Back)" (extended radio mix) – 4:45
A2. "Everybody (Backstreet's Back)" (Matty's Hip Hop Radio Remix) – 3:55
A3. "Everybody (Backstreet's Back)" (Kano's Undercurrent Dub) – 7:11
B1. "Everybody (Backstreet's Back)" (Sharp London Vocal Remix) – 7:58
B2. "Everybody (Backstreet's Back)" (Sharp Trade Dub) – 8:55

 Canadian CD single
 "Everybody (Backstreet's Back)" (7-inch version) – 3:44
 "Everybody (Backstreet's Back)" (extended version) – 4:45
 "Boys Will Be Boys" – 4:05
 "Anywhere for You" – 4:40

 UK and European CD single
 "Everybody (Backstreet's Back)" (7-inch version) – 3:44
 "Everybody (Backstreet's Back)" (extended version) – 4:45
 "Everybody (Backstreet's Back)" (MultiMan Remix) – 4:09
 "Everybody (Backstreet's Back)" (Matty's Remix) – 3:55
 "Everybody (Backstreet's Back)" (Max & Macario Club Mix) – 6:12

 UK CD single digipak
 "Everybody (Backstreet's Back)" (7-inch version) – 3:44
 "Everybody (Backstreet's Back)" (extended version) – 4:45
 "Boys Will Be Boys" – 4:05

Charts

Weekly charts

Year-end charts

Certifications

References

1997 songs
1997 singles
1998 singles
Backstreet Boys songs
Song recordings produced by Max Martin
Song recordings produced by Denniz Pop
Songs written by Max Martin
Songs written by Denniz Pop
Music videos directed by Joseph Kahn
Songs about dancing
Number-one singles in Hungary
Number-one singles in Romania
Number-one singles in Spain
Jive Records singles